Angel in Disguise is an album by singer, multi-instrumentalist and songwriter Leon Russell. The album was produced by Russell and released in 2006 by Leon Russell Records.

Track listing
All songs written by Leon Russell.
"Sweet Mimi" – 4:05
"How Can This Be Love" – 4:18
"Angel in Disguise" – 3:44
"Lovin' on My Mind" – 4:13
"Come for You" – 3:46
"Honey & Eli" – 4:55
"Black n' Blue" – 3:50
"All Through the Night" – 4:19
"Honkey Tonk Eyes" – 2:28
"Dyess Colony" – 3:47
"Desire Inside Your Eyes" – 5:13

References

External links
Leon Russell discography
Leon Russell lyrics
Leon Russell NAMM Oral History Program Interview (2012)

2006 albums
Leon Russell albums
Albums produced by Leon Russell